Asadabad-e Olya (also Romanized as Asadābād-e ‘Olyā) is a village in Firuzabad Rural District, Firuzabad District, Selseleh County, Lorestan Province, Iran. At the 2006 census, its population was 57, in 10 families.

References 

Towns and villages in Selseleh County